John Kline is the name of:

 John Kline (basketball) (fl. 1950s), retired Harlem Globetrotter (1953–1959) who founded the Black Legends of Professional Basketball in 1996
 John Kline (politician) (born 1947), American congressman from Minnesota
 John Robert Kline (1891–1955), American mathematician
 John Kline (elder) (1797-1864), American church elder

See also
John Klein (disambiguation)